Jorge Estuardo Vargas García (born 26 February 1993) is a Guatemalan professional footballer who plays as a midfielder for Liga Nacional club Guastatoya and the Guatemalan national team.

In 2013, he was called up to participate in the 2013 Copa Centroamericana in Costa Rica.

On 15 August 2018, he was called up once more and debuted in a friendly match against Cuba in a 3–0 victory.

On 5 September 2019, Vargas scored his first national for Guatemala in a major tournament against Anguilla in a decisive 10–0 victory in the CONCACAF Nations League.

International goals
Scores and results list Guatemala's goal tally first

Honours
Comunicaciones 
Liga Nacional de Guatemala: Clausura 2013, Clausura 2014, Clausura 2015

Guastatoya
Liga Nacional de Guatemala: Clausura 2018, Apertura 2020

References

External links
 

1993 births
Living people
Guatemalan footballers
Guatemala international footballers
Association football midfielders
Guatemala under-20 international footballers
Comunicaciones F.C. players
Antigua GFC players
C.D. Guastatoya players
Liga Nacional de Fútbol de Guatemala players